is a Quasi-National Park in southwest Gifu Prefecture, Japan. The park was established in 1970.

Attractions
, Ibi River, Mount Ikeda, Mount Yōrō, Sekigahara Battlefield, Tōkai Nature Trail, Yōrō Falls

Related municipalities
Ibigawa, Ikeda, Kaizu, Motosu, Ōgaki, Sekigahara, Tarui, Yōrō

See also

 National Parks of Japan
 Hida-Kisogawa Quasi-National Park

References

National parks of Japan
Parks and gardens in Gifu Prefecture
Protected areas established in 1970
1970 establishments in Japan